This is a list of Latin-pop artists from around the world, mainly musicians.

Argentina 

Abel Pintos
Adabel Guerrero
Adrián Barilari
Adriana Varela
Airbag
Alberto Cortez
Alberto Hassan
Alejandro Lerner
Amanda Ledesma
Amanda Miguel
Amelita Baltar
Andrés Ciro Martínez
Angeles Balbiani
Ariel Nan
Ariel Rot
Atahualpa Yupanqui
Axel
Baby Bell
Bahiano
Bandana
Barbara Luna
Beba Bidart
Belen Scalella
Benjamín Rojas
Berta Singerman
Brenda Asnicar
Cacho Castaña
Candela Vetrano
Candelaria Molfese
Carla Borghetti
Carlos Acuna
Carlos De Antonis
Cesar Maroll aka: "CESAR"
Charly Garcia
Clara Alonso
Claudio Basso
Claudio O'Connor
Coki Ramirez
Coti Sorokin
Cristina Altamira
Cynthia Nilson
Daniela Herrero
Dante Spinetta
Diego Torres
Diego Verdaguer
Dorismar
Eladia Blazquez
Enanitos Verdes
Erica Garcia
Fabiana Cantilo
Facundo Cabral
Facundo Gambandé
Federico Aubele
Fito Páez
Flor
Florencia Bertotti
Franco Fagioli
Gabriela Anders
Gary
Gastón Dalmau
Gilda
Gimena Accardi
Gustavo Cerati
Hilda Lizarazu
Horacio Guarany
Indio Solari
Isol
Javier Pantaleón
Jorge Cafrune
Juan Carlos Cáceres
Juan Pedro Lanzani
Juana Molina
Justo Lamas
King Africa
King Clave
Lali Espósito
Laura Natalia Esquivel
Leo Dan
Leo García
Leonardo Favio
Libertad Lamarque
lidia Borda
Lisandro Aristimuño
Lola Ponce
Lourdes
Luciano Pereyra
Luis Alberto Spinetta
Luis Lima
Luisana Lopilato
Macarena Achaga
Mambrú
Marcela Kloosterboer
Marcela Morelo
Marcelo Álvarez
María Cristina Kiehr
María Eugenia Suárez
María Fernanda Neil
María Martha Serra Lima
María Rosa Yorio
Mariana Esnoz
Mariana Fabbiani
Martina Stoessel
Mercedes Lambre
Mercedes Sosa
Micaela Vazquez
Miguel Abuelo
Milagros Flores
Miranda!
Moris
Nelly Omar
Néstor Fabián
Nicolás Riera
Nicolás Vázquez
Oscar Palavecino
Pablo Martínez
Pablo Ruiz
Palo Pandolfo
Patricia Sosa
Patricio Borghetti
Pedro Aznar
Piru Sáez
Raúl Lavié
Ricardo Iorio
Roberto Goyeneche
Rocio Igarzabal
Rolabogan
Romina Yan
Rosita Contreras
Sandra Mihanovich
Sandro de América
Sebastián Francini
Sebastian Schneider
Sobrenadar
Sofia Reca
Sol Rodriguez
Soledad Pastorutti
Suni Paz
Susana Rinaldi
Teen Angels
Tita Merello
Tormenta
Valeria Gastaldi
Valeria Lynch
Vanesa Gabriela Leiro
Vicentico
Victor Heredia
Victoria Maurette
Virginia Da Cunha
Virginia Luque
Walter Olmos
Yamila Cafrune
Zaima Beleno

Bolivia 

Azul azul
Carlos Palenque
Tarateño Rojas
Luzmila Carpio
Katia Escalera
Nilo Soruco

Brazil 

Anitta
Rita Lee
Cazuza
Barão Vermelho
Daniela Mercury
Cássia Eller
Gabby B
Ivete Sangalo
Jota Quest
Marisa Monte
Os Tribalistas
Paralamas do Sucesso
Pato Fu
Pitty
Roberto Carlos
Alexandre Pires
Sandy & Junior
Skank
Titãs
Wanessa Camargo
Xuxa
Kelly Key

Chile 

Anita Tijoux
Chancho en Piedra
Cuchufleta
Daniela Castillo
De Saloon
Denisse Malebrán
Difuntos Correa
DJ Méndez
Francisca Valenzuela
Glup!
Javiera y los Imposibles
Kudai
La Ley
Mon Laferte (a.k.a. Monserrat Bustamante)
Los Jaivas
Los Prisioneros
Los Tetas
Los Tres
Luis Jara
Myriam Hernández
Nicole
Saiko
Supernova
Tiro de Gracia
Ximena Abarca

Colombia 

Anasol
Andrés Cepeda
Bacilos
Cabas
Carlos Vives
Carolina Márquez
Charlie Zaa
Ekhymosis
Fanny Lú
Fonseca
Greeicy Rendón
Inés Gaviria
J Balvin
Jorge Villamizar
Juanes
Kema
Karol G
Karoll Márquez
Lucas Arnau
Maía
Maluma
Naty Botero
Poligamia
San Alejo
Sebastián Yatra
Shakira
Verónica Orozco

Cuba 
Erick Brian Colon (member of CNCO)
Adalberto Álvarez
Addys Mercedes
Albita
Alfredo de la Fé
Ángel Reyes
Armando Peraza
Arturo Sandoval
Aylín Mújica
Benny Moré
Blanca Rosa Gil
Camila Cabello
Cándido Fabré
Carlos Manuel Pruneda
Carlos Varela
Celia Cruz
Celina González
Cesar F. Morales
Christina Milian
Chucho Valdés
Compay Segundo
Conchita Espinosa
Cuban Link
Cubanito 20.02
Dámaso Pérez Prado
Dave Lombardo
David Calzado
Didier Hernández
Don Dinero
Elena Burke
Eliades Ochoa
Emilio Estefan 
Ernesto Lecuona
Fat Joe
Francisco Aguabella
German Nogueira Gomez
Gilberto Velázquez
Gloria Estefan
Gonzalo Rubalcaba
Guillermo Portabales
Habana Abierta
Harold Lopez Nussa
Horacio Gutiérrez
Hubert de Blanck

Dominican Republic 
 
Richard Camacho (member of CNCO) 
Antony Santos
Santaye
Raulin Rodriguez
Luis Vargas
Martha Heredia
Wason Brazobán
Frank Reyes
Aventura
Anaís
Pavel Núñez
Joe Blandino
Ramón Orlando
Vicente Garcia
Proyecto Uno
Fernando Villalona
Milly Quezada
Eddy Herrera
MDO
Monchy y Alexandra
Juan Luis Guerra
Luis Días
Toño Rosario
Luny Tunes
Johnny Ventura
Sergio Vargas
Xtreme
Alih Jey
Ophelia Marie
Angela Carrasco
Puerto Plata
Eladio Romero Santos
M.E.D

Ecuador 
 
Christopher Velez (member of CNCO)
Mirella Cesa
Pamela Cortes
Gerardo
Kiruba
Fausto Miño
Danilo Parra
La Pandilla (Not to be confused with teen music group)
Juan Fernando Velasco
Julio Jaramillo

El Salvador 

Álvaro Torres

Guatemala 

Ricardo Arjona
Shery
Carlos Peña

Honduras 

Quimera
Ytterbium
Banda Blanca

Mexico 

Joel Pimentel (member of CNCO)
Alejandro Fernández
Alejandro Ibarra (Alex Ibarra)
Aleks Syntek
Alexander Acha
Ana Gabriel
Anahí
Belanova
Belinda
Benny Ibarra
Bibi Gaytán
CD9
Camila
Cristian Castro
Cynthia Rodriguez
Diego Boneta
Diego Schoening
Dulce María
Edith Márquez
Eduardo Palomo
Fandango
Fey
Flans
Garibaldi
Gloria Aura
Grupo Play
Imanol
Jeans
Jesse y Joy
Jorge Blanco
José José
Juan Gabriel
Julieta Venegas
Kabah
Kairo
Kalimba
Leonel García
Litzy
Lorenzo Antonio
Lu
Lucero
Lucía Méndez
Luis Miguel Gallegos

Nicaragua 

Luis Enrique

Panama 

El General
La Factoría
Luci
MDO

Peru 

Gianmarco Zignago
Líbido
Mar de Copas
Los Nosequien y Los Nosecuantos
Pedro Suárez Vértiz

Puerto Rico 
 
Zabdiel De Jesús (member of CNCO)
Chayanne
Carlos Ponce
Daddy Yankee
Danny Rivera
Dayanara Torres
Don Omar
Elvis Crespo
Frankie Negrón
Gilberto Santa Rosa
Janina Irizarry
Jenilca Giusti
Jerry Rivera
José Feliciano
Kany García
La Secta Allstar
La India
Luis Fonsi
Yolandita Monge
Manny Manuel
Mary Ann Acevedo
MDO
Melina León
Menudo
Noelia
Olga Tañón
Obie Bermúdez
Rauw Alejandro
Ricky Martin
Tito Nieves
Toby Love
Shalim Ortiz
Sonya Cortés
Calle 13
Víctor Manuelle
Wisin & Yandel
Yaire
Ednita Nazario
Tommy Torres
J Alvarez
Farruko

Spain 

Abraham Mateo
Aitana
Pablo Alborán
Alaska
Alejandro Sanz
Álex Ubago
Álvaro Soler
Amaral
Ana Belén
Ana Guerra
Amistades Peligrosas
Azúcar Moreno
Baccara
Bebe
Beatriz Luengo
Chenoa
Camilo Sesto
D'NASH
David Bisbal
David Bustamante
David Civera
David DeMaría
David Summers
Duncan Dhu
Enrique Iglesias
Estopa
Fangoria
Idaira
Julio Iglesias
K-narias
La oreja de Van Gogh
La Quinta Estación
Locomía
Lorena
Mayte Macanás
Malú
María Isabel
Marta Sánchez
Mecano
Melody
Miguel Bosé
Miguel Rios
Mocedades
Monica Naranjo
Natalia
Nino Bravo
Princessa
Radio Futura
Raphael
Rebeca Pous Del Toro
Rocío Dúrcal
Rocío Jurado
Son de Sol
Victor Manuel

United States 

Ana Cristina
Angelica
Baby Bash
Barrio Boyzz
Becky G
Belinda Rio
Camila Cabello
Cardi B
Chingo Bling
Christina Aguilera
Carlito Olivero
Carlos PenaVega
CNCO
Demi Lovato
Eydie Gorme
Fijaron Maríon
Frankie J
Gisselle
Ha*Ash
Jaci Velasquez
Jencarlos Canela
Jenni Rivera
Jennifer Lopez
Jennifer Peña
Jimencio
J.D. Natasha
Kumbia Kings
Kumbia All Starz
La Mafia
Lani Hall
Lilian Garcia
Linda Ronstadt
Los Super Reyes
Marc Anthony
Mayra Veronica
Miami Sound Machine
Nicky Jam
Nydia Rojas
 Placido Domingo
Pitbull
Prince Royce
Romeo Santos
Selena
Selena Gomez
Sofia Carson
Soraya
Valeria Lynch
Vikki Carr

Uruguay 

Chocolate
Jorge Drexler
Natalia Oreiro

Venezuela 

Danny Ocean (singer)
Carlos Baute
Voz Veis
Franco De Vita
Ricardo Montaner
Mayré Martínez
Guillermo Dávila
Jeremías
María Rivas
Lila Morillo
Oscar D'Leon
Porfi Jiménez
Ilan Chester
Simon Diaz
Desorden Público
Los Amigos Invisibles
Freddy Marshall
Los Chamos
Los Terricolas
Caramelos de Cianuro
Roque Valero
Hany Kauam
Billo's Caracas Boys
Felipe Pirela
Chino y Nacho
Los Melodicos
Mirla Castellanos 
Kiara
Karina
Rudy La Scala
Pablo Manavello
José Luis Rodríguez "El Puma"
Gerry Weil

See also

 Lists of musicians

Latin pop